The Ministry of Justice for South Sudan was created when the country achieved its independence in 2011. The ministry performs functions such as representing the government in legal matters, drafting statutory laws, disseminating any legal-related documents to the public, and overseeing the legal profession in South Sudan.

List of ministers

See also

 Justice ministry
 Government of South Sudan
 Politics of South Sudan

References

Justice
South Sudan, Justice
South Sudan